The 1997 Croatian Bol Ladies Open was a women's tennis tournament played on outdoor clay courts in Bol in Croatia that was part of Tier IV of the 1997 WTA Tour. It was the fourth edition of the tournament and was held from 28 April through 4 May 1997. Unseeded Mirjana Lučić, who entered the main draw as a qualifier, won the singles title.

Finals

Singles

 Mirjana Lučić defeated  Corina Morariu 7–5, 6–7, 7–6
 It was Lučić's only title of the year and the 1st of her career.

Doubles

 Laura Montalvo /  Henrieta Nagyová defeated  María José Gaidano /  Marion Maruska 6–3, 6–1
 It was Montalvo's only title of the year and the 2nd of her career. It was Nagyová's 1st title of the year and the 2nd of her career.

External links
 ITF tournament edition details

Croatian Bol Ladies Open
Croatian Bol Ladies Open
1997 in Croatian tennis